Clifford Barnes, played by Ken Kercheval, is a fictional character from the popular American television series Dallas. The Barnes family are competitors and sometimes enemies of the Ewing family. Cliff is the son of Willard "Digger" Barnes and Rebecca Barnes, the brother of Pamela Barnes Ewing, and half-brother of Katherine Wentworth. J.R. Ewing was Cliff's personal nemesis, with J.R. and Cliff continuing on the bitter feud that started with their fathers, Jock Ewing and Digger, from their oil wildcatting days during the Great Depression. J.R. and Cliff were the only two characters to appear throughout the entire run of the series. A running gag on the series is Cliff's fondness for Chinese take-out.

History

Original series
During the show's conception, the character of Cliff was modeled on the late Robert F. Kennedy. However, he soon evolved into a bumbling sad sack who was very much his own worst enemy. A lawyer and a bureaucrat, not an oil man, Cliff was out of his element when dealing in the cutthroat oil business and, despite repeated attempts, would always be outsmarted and outdone by J.R. Ewing (Larry Hagman), his lifelong rival. Thanks to Carter McKay (George Kennedy), Cliff finally beats J.R. in the final season, and takes over Ewing Oil.

Cliff had a close relationship with his sister, Pamela (Victoria Principal) and hated that she married Bobby Ewing (Patrick Duffy), J.R.'s younger brother.

When Dallas began, Cliff worked for the state of Texas, building an impressive recorded reputation as investigator of corruption within the independent oil companies. It was no coincidence that these investigations often cited or targeted Ewing Oil. In the second season, Cliff was leading in polls during his campaign for the Senate against an Ewing-backed candidate, until J.R. leaked to the press that Cliff had arranged for an illegal abortion which killed his then-fiancee Penny. Penny had become pregnant by Cliff but refused to have the baby since she had been admitted to law school, so Cliff reluctantly fulfilled Penny's wish but she died during the operation as the abortion doctor turned out to be incompetent.

During the second and third seasons, Cliff's career took an upward swing when he was appointed Chief of the Office of Land Management, an enormously powerful (fictional) state agency that coordinated and approved all ventures that affected the surface and geological texture of Texas land, including oil drilling permits. In an attempt to lure Barnes out of this powerful position, J.R. Ewing enlisted attorney Alan Beam (Randolph Powell) in a scheme to form an exploratory funding committee (funds solely provided by J.R. Ewing) promoting Barnes as a candidate for the U.S. Congress. The scheme worked as Barnes resigned from his position to run for Congress. After his resignation, the money flow to the campaign stopped and Barnes was forced to drop out of the race.

Cliff had an affair with J.R.'s wife, Sue Ellen (Linda Gray) during the second season of Dallas. When Sue Ellen became pregnant, it was believed Cliff was the father of her baby. After a dizzy spell sent Digger (Keenan Wynn) to the doctor, he was diagnosed as a carrier of neurofibromatosis, a genetic disorder which he'd passed on to Cliff. As neurofibromatosis poses a greater threat to infants than to adults, the doctor strongly advised them not to have children. Cliff was worried that John Ross III (Tyler Banks) might develop the potentially fatal disease, but Bobby and Pam convinced him to keep quiet. They all decided to monitor the baby's health until he passed a critical age.

After Cliff was forced to drop out of the Congressional race, he quickly figured out that J.R. had been behind the plot and vowed revenge. When a newspaper reporter interviewed Digger about Cliff's resignation, he told her that Cliff was really the father of John Ross III. Cliff realized that the scandal would embarrass J.R. and sued for custody. In order to prove paternity, blood tests had to be performed on Sue Ellen and J.R. The first test proved inconclusive, but a second DNA test confirmed that J.R. was John Ross III's father after all.

In a major step backwards, Barnes took a position as a Dallas assistant district attorney. Shortly after taking the position, Barnes promoted the prosecution of Jock Ewing (Jim Davis) for a 30-year-old murder, which was dismissed after, ironically, Digger Barnes confessed to the murder on his deathbed. In season four, Cliff Barnes began working with state senator Dave Culver (Tom Fuccello), believing that Culver (the son of Sam Culver (John McIntire), a Texas and national political icon) would be destined for powerful office. During this time, Cliff also formed a "personal" relationship with Donna Culver (Susan Howard), who was Dave's most trusted advisor and the widow of Sam.  Relations between Donna and Cliff soured and quickly ended when Dave was appointed to the U.S. Senate and Donna's party committee chose Bobby Ewing (instead of Barnes) to run for his vacant state senate seat. After Bobby won the senate race, he asked Barnes to be his chief senate counsel - although mostly as a favour to Pam. Cliff accepted but after a short tenure, they had a falling out over Cliff's decision (without consulting Bobby) to start a senate investigation against J.R. for alleged organization of a counter-revolution in Southeast Asia.

In the course of the fourth season, Cliff's mother, Rebecca Wentworth (Priscilla Pointer) made a dramatic reentry into his life. After much debating, Cliff forgave her for her desertion. It also delighted Cliff that his mother was an important lady who was wealthy and powerful in her own right. Rebecca eventually offered him the presidency of Wentworth Tool & Die, a small subsidiary of Wentworth Industries, which made parts for oil rigs. Cliff happily accepted and did extraordinarily well for a time. Eventually Cliff asked for, and received, complete autonomy at Wentworth Tool & Die, but his fortunes took a dramatic downturn when he wasted Wentworth funds on a phony deal engineered by J.R.. Rebecca subsequently sacked him and this, coupled with Sue Ellen's decision to remarry J.R around the same time, drove Cliff to attempt suicide.

Cliff recovered, and Rebecca subsequently bought out Wade Luce Oil, renaming it Barnes-Wentworth Oil. Rebecca asked Cliff to run the company for her and he accepted. Blaming J.R. for Cliff's suicide attempt, Rebecca encouraged Cliff to use the company (and the place in the Cartel which came with it) to gain revenge. Armed with a new lease on life, and a new hatred for the Ewings, he became driven to succeed, and as a result, turned Barnes-Wentworth into a very successful company. That year, Cliff won the coveted "Oil Man Of the Year" award at the Oil Baron's Ball. However, instead of enjoying his success he embarrassed himself by verbally trashing Jock Ewing and Ewing Oil during his acceptance speech, resulting in a huge brawl. Soon after, Rebecca died injuries sustained in a plane crash, and Cliff inherited Barnes-Wentworth Oil, as well as a third of Wentworth Tool and Die (much to the disgust of his half sister Katherine (Morgan Brittany).

During the fifth season, Cliff and Sue Ellen became romantically involved again and he proposed marriage, however she turned him down and eventually remarried J.R. Cliff did find happiness again with aspiring singer Afton Cooper (Audrey Landers), the sister of Lucy Ewing's (Charlene Tilton) husband Mitch Cooper (Leigh McCloskey). It would later transpire that Afton gave birth to a daughter, Pamela Rebecca, after the end of her relationship with Cliff. At the start of the penultimate season, it was revealed that Pamela was indeed Cliff's daughter, although Afton, disgusted by Cliff's lying to her, tricked him into believing otherwise.

Cliff married Jamie Ewing (Jenilee Harrison), daughter of the late Jason Ewing and therefore a cousin of J.R. and Bobby, in 1985, but the union was unhappy as Cliff having married Jamie purely for the inheritance he always believed to be his birthright. During the 1985-86 season they realized how much they loved one another and became close. In April 1986, Jamie was seen trapped in a blazing car and presumed dead. But the entire 1985-86 season turned out to be the nightmare of Cliff's sister Pam, meaning Cliff and Jamie's happy marriage and her supposed death were just a dream, and thus Cliff and Jamie never found happiness. She left him in late 1986 and the union was headed for a divorce when Jamie was killed due to a fall while on a mountain climbing holiday.

Cliff eventually realizes his dream of taking over a share of Ewing Oil and for a time enjoys a good personal and business relationship with Bobby, whilst J.R. is temporarily sidelined from the business. It is notable that Cliff and Bobby appear to find mutual respect and liking only after Pamela has gone and their family ties are effectively severed. Cliff is also shown at this time to be a loving and attentive uncle to Christopher (Joshua Harris), who is suffering from the absence of his mother. Cliff enjoys a seemingly open welcome to Southfork during this time, something that would have been unheard of in earlier seasons. J.R. eventually returned to Ewing Oil and while they were briefly able to coexist, it didn't last. J.R.'s maneuvering and Cliff's inattention to the business due to his attempts to win back Afton ("the only woman I ever loved") soon had Cliff falling out of favor once again with the Ewings. By the end of the series, the feud that had characterized much of Dallas'''s run was firmly back on.

A theme of Cliff Barnes' character was social class conflict with his nemesis J.R. Ewing. Cliff had grown up poor in contrast to J.R. after the partnership between Cliff's father Digger and Jock Ewing dissolved, due in large part to Digger's heavy drinking. Jock went on to found Ewing Oil. Digger blamed Jock for his subsequent bad luck and was jealous of Jock's wealth. Cliff inherited Digger's resentment of the Ewings, and as well as the tendency to sometimes drink heavily. As time went on his hatred for the Ewings (with the exception of J.R.) dissipated, as Cliff realized that his father was not blameless in regards to the Barnes-Ewing feud. Throughout the series Cliff had a reputation for being cheap and naive in contrast to J.R. Whereas J.R. always dined in fine restaurants, wore a stylish Stetson, lived on Southfork and lavished his mistresses with generosity; Cliff often preferred take-out Chinese cuisine, wore cheap suits, lived in a condominium and assumed his romantic interests would clean his home. While J.R. was smooth talking and charismatic, Cliff tended to speak before he thought and frequently stuck his foot in his mouth. Much of the drama of Dallas was centered around Cliff's attempts to revenge himself against J.R. politically, romantically and financially. Typically, Cliff's schemes failed because of J.R.'s under-handed cleverness.

Cliff eventually got one over J.R. shortly before the TV series ended when he took over Ewing Oil.

In the series finale "Conundrum" in 1991, Cliff appears in J.R's dream where, with J.R. having never born, he was never pulled into the Barnes-Ewing feud. He became a lawyer who was married to a woman who loved him for himself, not his money, and had two grown children. He turns out to have become Vice President of the United States and at a party, learns the President has suffered a stroke and he's assumed the presidential powers and duties, as acting president.

Dallas: J.R. Returns
Cliff appeared in the 1996 film Dallas: J.R. Returns, wherein after 5 years at Ewing Oil, he decides he has had enough of the oil business, and looks to sell. Initially making a deal with West Star head Carter McKay, he eventually sells the company to Bobby and Sue Ellen, effectively ending the feud with J.R. when he decides that reuniting with his family (Afton and his long-lost daughter Pamela) is more important than beating J.R.

Dallas (2012 TV series)
Cliff reappeared in the 2012 continuation of the series, which  picks up 20 years after the original series concluded and ignores the events of the two 1990s TV movies.

Despite having taken control of Ewing Oil in 1991, Cliff (for reasons that were never made entirely clear) decided to renew the feud with the Ewings.  He also emerges as a far more darker, sinister and sociopathic character.

As the series begins, Cliff is involved in a casino business. He returns to Dallas and has a meeting with Bobby at Southfork Ranch. Cliff wants to buy Southfork, which Bobby has put up for sale. J.R. walks in on their conversation and warns Cliff against trying to buy the Ewing family home. Cliff later invites his adoptive nephew, Christopher, and his new wife, Rebecca, to dinner and expresses an interest in investing in Christopher's energy project. Christopher declines, as he thinks that Cliff just wants to antagonize the Ewings again; however, Cliff warns him not to let the Ewings destroy him like they did his adoptive mother, Pamela. When J.R. arrives at Sue Ellen's office to give her Miss Ellie's pearls, a good luck charm for her Texas gubernatorial campaign, Cliff arrives to take Sue Ellen to lunch to discuss politics. When questioned about trying to buy Southfork, Cliff announces, "I will never stop fighting for what is rightfully mine."

In addition, sometime between the end of the original series and the 2012 continuation, Cliff Barnes started a new company, Barnes Global, which owns hundreds of subsidiaries in over fifty countries. His desire to spite the Ewing family persists and Cliff eventually directs the bombing of a methane-extracting rig belonging to Ewing Energies, which results in the deaths of Christopher and Rebecca's two unborn children. As an aside, no mention was ever made of the neurofibromatosis gene that Cliff carries. Years before, he'd vowed never to have children, because he feared they could die of the disease. As the gene is passed from the carrier to their offspring, the risk that Rebecca or her children could suffer is high.

The ensuing events result, at the end of season two, in the Ewings taking control of Barnes Global and folding it into a larger company known as Ewing Global, with Cliff sitting in a Mexican jail, charged with murdering J.R. Ewing. However, he managed to reach out to Elena Ramos and reveal more of J.R.'s nefarious business tactics. In a surprising twist, he revealed to Elena her father had been fleeced out of the land J.R. managed to profit off of by having the deed to part of his family's land and her father's land switched so Elena's father got the piece of land that lacked any oil. As her father lost his life trying to find oil on it and her brother trafficked drugs to purchase the land back from the Ewings, his revelation seemed to sway her. He told Elena to make the Ewings pay for J.R.'s  sins against her family and gave her proxy over the one-third share of Barnes Global he still owned in the company.

It is revealed in the season one finale that Christopher's wife known to him as Rebecca Sutter is actually Cliff's daughter Pamela, known in the original series as Pamela Rebecca Cooper. Cliff is shown to be behind Rebecca's attempt to hustle Christopher.

Although Pamela had discovered the Ewings had set up Cliff for the murder of J.R., she had chosen to leave Cliff in prison because he had blown up the rig and caused her to lose her unborn children. She had however given him the deed to the land that Digger had deserved, only at the expense of not being able to enjoy it. Cliff was then left in prison.

Legacy
A restaurant in Stockholm's Vasastan district has operated under the name of the television character for at least two decades. In the 1980s, a German punk rock band went by the name Cliff Barnes and the Fear of Winning.

References

External links
Cliff Barnes Biography at Ultimate Dallas''.com

Dallas (TV franchise) characters
Television characters introduced in 1978
Fictional characters from Texas
Fictional businesspeople
Fictional American lawyers